The National Prize for Literature (Premio Nacional de Literatura) is awarded biennially, in odd-numbered years, by the , to "books in the genres of poetry, narrative, essay, or theater, written in Spanish or Guaraní, by Paraguayan or foreign authors with at least five years of residence in Paraguay." It was established in 1990 by Law No. 97/90, which also created the National Prize for Science, awarded in even-numbered years. This was updated by Law No. 1149 in 1997.

Its jury is composed of "five people of recognized experience, suitability, and prestige in literature".

Winners receive a sum equivalent to 50 times the monthly minimum wage. , this was ₲114,466,200 (US$).

List of winners
 1991: Elvio Romero
 1993: (not given)
 1995: Augusto Roa Bastos
 1997: José Luis Appleyard
 1999: Hugo Rodríguez-Alcalá
 2001: 
 2003: Carlos Martínez Gamba
 2005: Rubén Bareiro Saguier
 2007: 
 2009: 
 2011: Renée Ferrer de Arréllaga
 2013: Alcibiades González Delvalle
 2015: Maybell Lebron
 2017: Susy Delgado
 2019: Maribel Barreto
 2021: Susana Gertopán

References

1990 establishments in Paraguay
Awards established in 1990
Paraguayan literary awards